The Reef 2: High Tide is a 2012 computer-animated adventure comedy film and the sequel to 2006's Shark Bait. It stars the same actors as last time, with the exception of Freddie Prinze Jr. and Evan Rachel Wood, who are replaced by Drake Bell and Busy Philipps. Although Donal Logue reprised his role as the villainous tiger shark Troy, he replaces John Rhys-Davies as elderly harbor seal Thornton. Rob Schneider reprised his role as Nerissa, Bart, Eddie, and many more.

Plot

Troy is revealed to be still alive and captured by the humans, locked in a cage and occasionally getting painful vaccines from them. However, with the help of a con-artist dwarf shark named Ronny, he manages to escape and decides to seek revenge on Pi.

At the reef, Pi is a father and enjoying life on the reef with no sharks. But Troy and his band of goons arrive at the reef wall and threaten the fish that in four days the water will rise high enough for the sharks to swim over the reef wall. Nerissa tells Pi that he must  but tries to train the other fish to defeat Troy this time. Meanwhile, Troy threatens Ronny into following his orders by sabotaging Pi's training and tells him in exchange, he will let Ronny go. Ronny disguises himself with a piece of kelp as a wig and false dentures on is teeth. Witnessing Pi's disastrous training, Ronny gets an idea. He announces that the fish put on an "underwater extravaganza" saying every fish has a special skill, and by doing that, they will attract humans to protect them from the sharks. Everybody but Pi is enlightened by Ronny's plan. When Pi confronts Nerissa about this, Nerissa suggests that Ronny perhaps "offers something you haven't like a chance to prove themselves." Pi retorts that he tried train them to which Nerissa responds "I suggested that you teach them to be the best they can be--not to be you." He then shows Pi an image of the legendary Sea Dragon, which those who control it must be worthy to command it. When Pi asks him if he's ever tried summoning the Sea Dragon, Nerissa responds "many times."

Pi gets an idea to create a shark trap to catapult Troy out of the sea and orders the two to get him supplies. When Pi and his son Junior set up the trap, Pi orders Bart and Eddie to guard the grotto. However, Ronny overhears Pi's trap and Troy orders him to destroy it. So Ronny tricks the reef fish that he needs a clamp for his talent show and the reef fish soon suddenly race towards the grotto and destroy the Shark Trap. Bart & Eddie report the disaster to Pi. When Pi furiously confronts Ronny, Cordelia defends him, saying that Ronny believes in them the way they are and Pi didn't. Pi leaves sadly.

The next day, Troy and his goons ambush Pi and the evil shark threatens the fish that he's gonna destroy the reef tomorrow and that "shame you're gonna miss it." Troy bares his teeth, but Nerissa arrives from behind Troy and uses a sandstorm to make Pi literally disappear from the sharks. Troy, frustrated, orders his goons to move out.

Later, Troy orders Ronny to bring Cordelia outside the reef at sunset. When Ronny succeeds, Troy exposes Ronny's disguise to Cordelia, much to her horror. But Ronny, having grown to love the reef and the inhabitants, tries to explain himself, but Troy kidnaps Cordelia. Deciding that Ronny had outlived his usefulness, Troy decides to let him go.

Pi lies in pain in Nerissa's shipwreck when they hear a noise. They see Bart & Eddie having captured Ronny when he's exposed as a shark and bring him to Pi. But Ronny remorsefully tells Pi that Troy was forcing him and that he'll help Pi get Cordelia back from Troy. Pi, Nerissa, Bart and Eddie decide to give the remorseful dwarf shark a second chance. While Pi frees Cordelia, Ronny blocks the hench-sharks' path telling them to stand up to Troy. Unfortunately, Troy had overheard and furious with Ronny's betrayal, Troy gobbles the little dwarf shark up in one gulp.

Meanwhile, as the other fish try to prepare for the shark battle, Nerissa enters a mysterious volcano to summon the sea dragon, and mysterious powers flow around the turtle as he summons the mysterious dragon.

Troy and his sharks attack the reef, as many fish outsmart them. Troy bites Pi and subdues him but before he can kill him, Nerissa shows up with his powerful sea dragon and blasts the other sharks. But Troy sneaks up from behind the turtle and knocks him off the dragon, causing it to dissolve away. Troy then prepares to hurt Nerissa but Pi throws a Water Ball at him, and Troy returns his attention to his sole nemesis and gives chase to him. Eventually Pi, Cordelia, and Junior use the shark trap to beat Troy and send him flying out of the sea and back to the ship. As the humans approach the defeated shark, Ronny flies out of Troy's mouth and back into the sea. The humans then use another vaccine on Troy and he screams in pain (which the fish don't hear underwater).

As all the fish celebrate the defeat of Troy, Nerissa congratulates Pi for becoming a true leader. Pi and the gang thank Nerissa for risking his life for all of them to which the turtle responds "It was my part to play." Nerissa then dances with the other fish, just as a fully redeemed Ronny joins the party.

Cast
 Drake Bell as Pi, an orange wrasse fish who is the new leader of the reef, Cordelia's husband and Junior's father. He was previously voiced by Freddie Prinze Jr. in the first film.
 Busy Philipps as Cordelia, a pink angelfish who is Pi's wife and Junior's mother. She was previously voiced by Evan Rachel Wood in the first film.
 Frankie Jonas as Pi Jr., a young wrasse fish who is the son of Pi and Cordelia.
 Donal Logue as Troy, an evil tiger shark and Pi's archenemy who now has an identity number “Alpha 010”, as Ronny calls him. He seeks revenge on Pi for tricking him into going near a massive fishing net. He makes a cameo in the 2022 Netflix film Marmaduke (2022 film). Logue reprised his role from the first film.
 Logue also voices Thornton, an elderly harbor seal and a resident of the Reef. He was previously voiced by John Rhys-Davies in the first film.
 Rob Schneider as Nerissa, a loggerhead sea turtle and Pi's mentor
 Schneider also voices Bart and Eddie, Troy's former henchmen who now serve as Pi's personal assistants and sidekicks. Bart is still a smart sophisticated barracuda while Eddie is a dimwitted wolf eel. Schneider also voices other characters like Bud, Doom, a hammerhead shark who is one of Troy’s goons, a lobster, Madge the starfish, Max the decorator crab, a pelican, and a sea sponge.
 Andy Dick as Dylan, a teal Elongate surgeonfish who is Pi's cousin and Junior's uncle
 Audrey Wasilewski as Aunt Pearl, a purple Elongate surgeonfish who is Dylan's mother, Pi’s aunt and Junior’s great aunt. She was previously voiced by Fran Drescher in the first film.
 Jamie Kennedy as Ronny, a purple dogfish who was used by Troy to stop Pi's coaching skills
 Jack Mullins as navy diver
 Stephen Stanton as Jack, one of the marlins.
 Matthew Willig as Bronson, a great white shark and one of Troy's goons.
 Eric Lopez as Hector, a copper shark and a member of Troy's gang.
 Neil Ross as Schliemann, a lemon shark and one of Troy’s goons.

Reception

References

External links
 
 

2012 computer-animated films
2012 films
2010s American animated films
2010s Korean-language films
South Korean animated films
Films about sharks
Animated films about fish
Animated films directed by Mark A.Z. Dippé
South Korean sequel films
2010s English-language films
2010s South Korean films